Sabra is a character appearing in American comic books published by Marvel Comics. Created by Bill Mantlo and Sal Buscema, the character first appeared in Incredible Hulk #250 (August 1980) in a cameo, before making a full appearance in Incredible Hulk #256 (February 1981).

Sabra is the alter ego of the Israeli superheroine Ruth Bat-Seraph. She belongs to the subspecies of humans called mutants, who are born with superhuman abilities, and serves as an agent to the Israeli secret service known as the Mossad.

Sabra is slated to appear in the Marvel Cinematic Universe film Captain America: New World Order (2024), portrayed by Israeli actress Shira Haas.

Publication history
Sabra made a cameo appearance in Incredible Hulk #250 (August 1980), but first fully appeared in Incredible Hulk #256 (February 1981). She was created by Bill Mantlo and Sal Buscema. Belinda Glass, a singer and the first wife of Marvel writer Mark Gruenwald, came up with the name and concept of the character. "Sabra" is a slang term for a native-born Israeli Jew; the name refers to the prickly pear cactus, which is tough on the outside but soft and sweet on the inside.

Fictional character biography
Ruth Bat-Seraph was born near Jerusalem, Israel. She was raised on a special kibbutz run by the Israeli government after her power manifested. Ruth was the first superhuman agent to serve with the Mossad (the Israeli secret service). She became a police officer in addition to serving as a government agent. Her first public act as Sabra was a battle with the Hulk, whom she mistakenly believed was working with terrorists. Not long after that, Sabra was chosen as a pawn of Death in the latter's game against the Grandmaster. There, she met Iron Man and the Arabian Knight, and battled She-Hulk and Captain Britain. She later appeared at the Hulk's amnesty ceremony in Washington, D.C. Some years later, Sabra's young son was killed in a terrorist attack. She disobeyed orders in order to bring her son's killers to justice.

Another dispute with the Hulk was intensified as Sabra's powers temporarily robbed him of his voice, making it seem as if he was still a near-mindless monster. She fought the Hulk, but the two worked through their differences and attempted to search for a child who was foretold to become a genocidal maniac, while contending with Achilles of the Pantheon, who was sent to kill the boy.

Later, during a peace process meeting, Sabra finds herself fighting the New Warriors while under the mental influence of a mysterious, unexplained force. Some time after, Sabra finds herself caught up in the events of the anti-mutant campaign known as "Operation: Zero Tolerance". It is at this time that Sabra fights alongside the X-Men and begins to subscribe to the philosophies of Charles Xavier. Sabra spends some time as a member of the X-Corporation's Paris branch. She accompanies Xavier and other X-Men to Genosha after it was demolished by Sentinels.

During the JLA/Avengers crossover event she was seen holding the Wailing Wall together after Krona's attack cause earthquakes across the globe.

Sabra is one of a handful of mutants to have retained their powers after the effects of M-Day. She is later seen, under request from the British government, aiding Union Jack against a terrorist attack on London. She comes into conflict with the new Arabian Knight because of cultural differences, but they begrudgingly work together, paralleling her relationship with the first Arabian Knight during the Contest of Champions.

During the Civil War within the US superhero community over the Superhuman Registration Act, Sabra joins Bishop's government-sanctioned team that polices unruly mutants. Mossad assigns her to the force in exchange for intelligence and technology so Israel can enact its own registration program. Sabra is identified as pro-registration in the superhuman Civil War as one of the 142 registered superheroes under the Initiative.

During the events of Secret Invasion, Sabra is briefly seen fighting off Skrulls in Israel.

During the Ends of the Earth storyline, Sabra is one of the heroes that respond to Spider-Man's call for help against Doctor Octopus' satellite factories. She is shown fighting through Octobots at a seemingly abandoned factory until being shot by Crossbones with a sniper rifle.

Sabra later represented the Israeli government when she attended Black Panther's meeting in the Eden Room of Avengers Mountain.

Powers and abilities
Sabra's mutant power has enhanced all of her body's physical abilities, such as strength, speed, agility, reflexes, endurance and stamina, to superhuman levels. She can withstand impacts up to high caliber rifle fire, though she has been wounded by fire from an MP-40 sub-machine gun. Sabra can heal regeneratively faster and more extensively than a regular human being.

She is also able to charge other individuals by transferring to them her own life energy, and in the process, enhance their physical state of health (she has twice used this ability to save dying individuals) and granting them low-level super-powers, which are apparently at random and otherwise unrelated to Sabra's own mutant powers (such as the wind-generating powers given to a woman who took the costumed identity Windstorm). The recipient retains their new powers until Sabra herself decides to withdraw them by retrieving her life energy. Her standard power levels drop when she gives away her life energy (she has been shown losing up to half her natural physical power), but they return to normal once she takes back her life energy.

Equipment 
Her various costumes, usually based on the design or colors of the Israeli flag, contain additional paraphernalia to enhance her combat capabilities. She wears a cape that contains a secret Israeli gravity-polarization device, which allows her to neutralize gravity's effect on her mass, and a tight array of four electric micro-turbines which impel air for sufficient thrust for inertia-less mass to fly at subsonic speeds. She wears special, pressure-reduction valve nose filters to allow her to breathe at high speeds and high altitudes. The cape also contains a wafer-thin computer system which processes her mental commands received by the circuitry in her tiara. The cape also has an optical navigation device which functions as an auto-pilot. Besides her cape, Sabra also has neuronic-frequency stunners built into her two wrist bracelets that shoot "energy quills", small bundles of low-density plasma (like balled lightning), that travel just below the speed of sound and paralyze the nervous system of any organic being almost instantaneously.

In addition to her superhuman abilities and equipment, Sabra possesses the standard weapons, and armed and unarmed-combat training given to members of the Israeli military. She is trained in police methods and skills and in anti-terrorist techniques.

Reception

Critical reception 
Nirit Anderman of Haaretz named Sabra the "first Israeli superheroine," writing, "Although there were several attempts to create local superheroes in Israel – for example Sabraman, Super Shlumper and Falafel Man – none of them managed to survive for long. The only ones who succeeded in this mission, even going one step further and creating a female superhero rather than a male one, were the guys from Marvel." Deirdre Kaye of Scary Mommy called Sabra a "role model" and "truly heroic." Nicole Lampert of The Jewish Chronicle called Sabra a "great Jewish superhero." Brenton Stewart of CBR.com referred to Sabra as one of "Marvel's most prominent international heroes," saying, "While she's never had her own series, she's carved out one of the most fascinating histories of any of Marvel's international heroes in her various encounters with the X-Men, the Hulk and Marvel's other heroes," while Scoot Allan ranked her 7th in their "10 Strongest Female Marvel Protagonists" list. 

Dalton Norman of Screen Rant included Sabra "10 Best Marvel Characters Who Made Their Debut In The Hulk Comics" list, asserting, "It wasn't long before Sabra became an important fixture in the Marvel Universe, and she has popped up on numerous occasions including as a vocal supporter of the X-Men and their defense of the mutant cause." Cali Halperin of Jewish Telegraphic Agency named Sabra one of the "5 female Jewish superheroes everyone should know." Margaret David of SlashfFilm included Sabra in their "10 Marvel Characters We Expect To See Introduced In MCU Phase 5" list, asserting, "With the world of the Avengers under siege by new paranoia and powers, mirroring our world's rampant and long-standing problem of anti-Semitism, Sabra's probably going to be the vehicle for meaningful commentaries. Further, it's going to be great to see more diversity and faith in our heroes."

Other versions

House of M: Masters of Evil
In the House of M reality, Sabra is a member of the Red Guard and assists them in their fight against the Hood's Masters of Evil.

Ultimate Marvel
In the Ultimate Marvel reality, Sabra (under her real name) appears as a severed head on the wall of a hideout of the supervillain Doctor Faustus, along with the heads of agents from other intelligence agencies who were sent after him.

In other media
 Sabra makes a cameo appearance in the Fantastic Four: The Animated Series episode "Doomsday."
 Sabra will appear in the upcoming Marvel Cinematic Universe film Captain America: New World Order, portrayed by Shira Haas.

See also
Sabra (person)

References

External links
 

Characters created by Bill Mantlo
Characters created by Sal Buscema
Comics characters introduced in 1981
Fictional Israeli Jews
Fictional Jewish women
Fictional Jews in comics
Fictional Mossad agents
Israeli superheroes
Jewish superheroes
Marvel Comics characters who can move at superhuman speeds
Marvel Comics characters with superhuman strength
Marvel Comics mutants
Marvel Comics female superheroes
Marvel Comics police officers